Rock Creek Township is a township in Butler County, Kansas, USA.  As of the 2000 census, its population was 299.

History
Rock Creek Township was created in 1872.

Geography
According to the USGS, it contains one cemetery, McCabe.

The streams of Chigger Creek and Swisher Branch run through this township.

Further reading

References

 USGS Geographic Names Information System (GNIS)

External links
 City-Data.com

Townships in Butler County, Kansas
Townships in Kansas